The 2nd Army Division is a unit of the Argentine Army.

Organization 

 2nd Army Division, in Córdoba
 V Mountain Brigade, in Salta
 VI Mountain Brigade, in Neuquén
 VIII Mountain Brigade, in Mendoza

See also 

 1st Army Division (Argentina)
 3rd Army Division (Argentina)

References

External links 
 argentina.gob.ar/ejercito

Army units and formations of Argentina